"Comme des Garçons (Like the Boys)" is a song by Japanese-British singer Rina Sawayama. It was released on 17 January 2020 as the second single off of Sawayama's debut studio album Sawayama through the record label Dirty Hit. The song blends genres such as disco, dance, funk, house, electro house and synth-pop into a "clubby" record. The song also received a music video.

On 21 February, a remix of the song, featuring Brazilian singer and drag queen Pabllo Vittar was released.

Background 
When discussing the track's lyrical content, Sawayama stated, "When I was writing this song I wanted on one hand to lyrically explore the idea of people having to adopt negative male tropes to appear confident, whilst on the other sonically paying homage to the early 2000s dance tracks that made me feel confident. The idea that the socially acceptable version of confidence is in acting "like the boys," otherwise as a woman you get called a bitch - but in the club, we reclaim the word "bitch" as a sign of ultimate confidence ("yes bitch," "work bitch"). I wanted to sit these two together and make a club fashion banger that makes you feeling like THAT bitch whoever you are". The track was originally inspired by a conversation about "the arrogance of would-be presidential hopeful Beto O’Rourke".

Composition 
"Comme des Garçons (Like the Boys)" is a "pulsating" and "couture-wielding" disco, dance, funk, house, electro house and synth-pop track which features lo-fi production, influences of Eurodance, "fat" bass, "bouncy" synths, a "glitzy" beat and a tempo of 119 beats per minute. Lyrically, it is a "chill celebration of true confidence" and criticizes the social expectation "how people, regardless of gender, are often expected to only express confidence in conventionally masculine ways".

The production of the remix, handled by Brazilian DJ Brabo, is "infectious" and features a "club-ready" beat and "experimental" synths, as well as a bridge from Vittar.

Music video 
On 26 February 2020, the music video for "Comme des Garçons" premiered on YouTube. Directed by Eddie Whelan, the video is "90s-inspired" and shows the singer "dressed in stereotypically male clothing [...] being scanned and examined in a space-age lab, before transforming into a high fashion look and being literally propped up by throngs of men surrounding her in a multicolored landscape". Sawayama explained the idea behind it, stating, "We wanted to make a music video that’s got humour, movement and is essentially a fashion film that combined the visual worlds of Hype Williams, Hiroyuki Nakano, and Boris Vallejo".

Track listing
Digital download
"Comme des Garçons (Like the Boys)" – 3:01

Digital download – Brabo Remix
"Comme des Garçons (Like the Boys)" [Brabo Remix] (featuring Pabllo Vittar) – 3:42
"Comme des Garçons (Like the Boys)" – 3:01
"STFU!" – 3:23

References 

Rina Sawayama songs
2020 songs
2020 singles
Dirty Hit singles
Disco songs
Dance music songs
Funk songs
House music songs
Electro house songs
Synth-pop songs
Songs with feminist themes
Songs written by Nicole Morier
Songs written by Rina Sawayama